Diana Karazon (born October 30, 1983) is a Jordanian singer of Arabic pop, television host, and actress. She won Superstar, the Arabic version of Pop Idol.

Karazon was born in Kuwait City, Kuwait, but her origin comes from Birzeit, Palestine.

Singles
 2003 insani ma binsak
 2003 elshar barra w baed
 2004 omri lw lilah
 2005 El Omr Mashi
 2005 lamma teba habibi
 2006 ah bemazagy
 2007 w badat aiesh
 2007 inta mashi bgad
 2007 hibni dom
 2007 Asemt alzaman
 2007 mahabetnesh
 2008 kalam alain
 2008 Operate Live Show in Khartoum – SUDAN (Hansa3edhoum) (We Will Help Them, Our Children) Song Wrote By Mohamed Almohaned Hassan Dabora
 2008 yalla olha
 2009 resalat insan a message to Barack Obama
 2009 Jarh
 2009 momkin ansak
 2009 shaif alai nafsak
 2010 enta al gharam
 2010 fe had eshtakalak
 2010 wesh el tary
 2010 Rasak Bel Aaly
 2010 adet layaly
 2010 Tartelat al Om Alhazena – Words from sad Mother.
 2010 Hala Ya Ordonieh
 2011 Kazzeb Alye – Lie To Me.
 2012 elkaddab el kebeer
 2012 awal shetwe b amman
 2012 Mazzika hadya

Discography
 2003 Super Star El Arab
 2005 El Omr Mashi
 2008 October 14, 2008 Cancer Children Assosation(99199) – Big Concert in Khartoum (Idea of Eng. Mohamed Almohaned Hassan Dabora as Creative Manager & he Also wrote The Song Of Hansa3edhom (We Will Help Our Children).
 2010 Diana 2010
 2010 Rasak Bel Aaly (Special National Patriotic album dedicated to Jordan)

Filmography
 2003 SuperStar
 2004 Win with Diana
 2009 Deut with Diana
 2010 Aldef defak
 2010 Montaha Aleshq  Egyptian TV series
 2010 attajroba real life experience
 2011 Nouna alma`azona as her self

Superstar Performances
Top 55: أكذب عليك (Akdib Aleyk) by Warda
Top 12: 
Top 10: 
Top 8: آه يا ليل (Ah Ya Leel) by Ragheb Alama
Top 7: إبعتلي جواب (Iba'atli Jawab) by Nour Mehana
Top 6: ألف ليلة وليلة (Alf Leela W Leela) by Umm Kulthum
Top 5: دنيا الوله (Dinya Min El Wala) by Abdallah Al Rowaished
Top 4: أنا في انتظارك (Ana Fi Entazarak) by Umm Kulthum
Top 4: مغرومة (Maghroume) by Najwa Karam
Top 3: أكذب عليك (Akdib Aleyk) by Warda
Top 3: البوسطه (El Posta) by Fairuz
Top 3: 
Grand Final: لسا فاكر (Lissa Faker) by Umm Kulthum
Grand Final: 
Grand Final: تعا ننسى (Ta'a Ninsa) by Melhem Barakat

References

1983 births
Living people
People from Kuwait City
Jordanian women singers
Jordanian people of Palestinian descent
Jordanian people of Syrian descent
Syrian Kurdish women
Jordanian film actresses
Jordanian television actresses
Idols (TV series) winners
SuperStar (Arabic TV series)
Contestants from Arabic singing competitions
21st-century women singers